Her Gallant Knights is a 1913 American silent short romantic comedy film starring William Garwood, Riley Chamberlin, James Cruze, Florence La Badie and Frank Urson.

External links

1913 films
1910s romantic comedy films
American romantic comedy films
American silent short films
American black-and-white films
1913 short films
1913 comedy films
1910s American films
Silent romantic comedy films
Silent American comedy films